Espostoa melanostele is a species of rare, endangered, long-lived, slow-growing plant in the family Cactaceae.

Endangerment
Horticultural collection and the fact that the plant is slow growing contribute to the fact that the plant is endangered.

Drought tolerance
This xerophyte is tolerant of most droughts when mature.

Subspecies
 Espostoa melanostele subsp. melanostele
 Espostoa melanostele subsp. nana  synonym Espostoa nana

Uses
The plant is not only used for its fruit, but also grown for decorative qualities, such as its yellow flowers and its white ''fleece''.

Cultivars
A cultivar, E. melanostele 'Peruvian old lady', is so-named because of its resemblance to an old lady (especially when flowering and fruiting).

Hazards
The spines may be considered a hazard to children, but actually come off the skin very easily with proper handling.

References

 CX Furtado, (1964). Concerning the types of genera, Taxon.

Trichocereeae
Cacti of South America
Flora of Ecuador
Flora of Peru
Flora of the Andes